This is a list of  Spanish words of uncertain origin.  Some of these words existed in Latin and/or Ancient Greek, but are thought by some scholars to ultimately come from some other source.  Many of these words have alternate etymologies and may also appear on a list of Spanish words from a different language.

A
ademán 
agachar 
agalla 
ají 
amargo 
anchoa 
añicos 
Apache 
ardilla 
areito 
arete 
aro
arrancar 
arrear 
arriero 
arveja/alverja 
asustar

B
balde (barrel, tub) 
barato 
barraca 
barro 
bata 
baúl 
beso 
bisagra 
bizco 
borrar 
borrego 
bronce 
bruja 
buitre 
burla 
burlar 
buscar

C
cabaña, 
cacarear 
caleta 
cama 
cambur 
camilla 
canica 
caracol 
carcajada 
catalán 
cataluña 
cebra 
celta 
cagarra 
changa 
chango 
charco  
chileno 
chipre 
chiste 
chorro 
chupar 
cibernética 
coco 
cochino,
cucubano

D
danza 
derrocar 
destrozar

E
-ez (name suffix)

G
gabacho
gacho 
gago 
gana 
ganga 
garbanzo 
garza 
gobernar 
godo 
gorra 
gorrión 
gorro 
gótico 
graznar 
gusano,

H
hipo

J
judía (lima bean) 
juey

L
lama 
latir 
laurel 
leopardo 
lerdo 
lirio water lily
liso 
listo

M
malgache 
malva 
manteca 
mantecado 
mantequilla 
mascota 
maullar 
metralla 
mimo 
mimar 
mohíno 
moho 
moneda 
moño 
mueca 
migir

N
nabo 
niña

O
ola 
olivo
-ón= augmentative suffix (opposite of a diminutive suffix), as found in balón "big ball.": the same as Italian -one.  Examples: guitarrón (from guitarra), salchichón (from salchicha).  Exceptions (nouns ending in -ón that are not in the augmentative): aguijón, camarón, empujón.

P
pantano 
pantalla 
pantera 
parra 
parrilla 
pata 
patán 
patear 
patillas 
patín 
patio 
pato 
patrulla 
pavana 
pelícano 
peluca 
pequeño 
pera 
pito 
porrazo 
prado

S
sabotear 
saeta 
salpicar 
salsifí 
senda 
sendero 
sodio 
soga 
sucre 
susto

T
titere 
tonto 
topar
tope 
trenza 
trocar 
tropa 
tropel 
troza 
truco

Z
zángano 
zapato

See also
Linguistic history of Spanish
List of English words of Spanish origin

References
"Breve diccionario etimológico de la lengua española" by Guido Gómez de Silva

uncertain